Sonthakkaran is a 1989 Indian Tamil-language action film, directed by L. Raja and produced by M. Saravanan, M. Balasubramanian & M. S. Guhan. The film was dubbed into Telugu Kondaveeti Dada. The film stars Arjun and Nirosha, while Sarath Babu, Madhuri, Radha Ravi and S. S. Chandran portray pivotal roles. The film was released on 16 June 1989 and was commercially successful upon release.

Plot
Rajadurai (Arjun) arrests Yuvaraj (Nassar) for raping a woman and killing an old man. Chalapathi Rao (Radha Ravi) father of Yuvaraj gets Rajadurai trapped in false rape charge and he loses his job. Yuvaraj comes back from the Jail to take revenge against Rajadurai.

Cast

Arjun Sarja as Rajadurai "Raja"
Nirosha as Rekha
Sarath Babu as Chelladurai
Madhuri as Lakshmi
Radha Ravi as Chalapathi Rao
S. S. Chandran as Singaram
Nasser as Yuvaraj
Charle as a resident of Bharath Nagar 
Chinni Jayanth as Vasu
Silk Smitha as Sudha
Master Vimal as young Rajadurai
Master Suresh as young Chelladurai
Master Charan as Babu
G. Srinivasan as Rajadurai and Chelladurai's father
K. K. Soundar as a bus conductor
Yuvasree as a victim of Yuvaraj
Kumaresan as Vasu's friend
Peeli Sivam as a police inspector
Premi as bus conductor's wife
Ennathe Kannaiah as Chelladurai's farm worker
Pasi Sathya as Sathya
Omakuchi Narasimhan as Chalapathi Rao's assistant
Jeeva as Ravayya
Azhagu as RKV
Thideer Kannaiah as Chelladurai and Sudha's servant
K. Rajan as a resident of Bharath Nagar

Soundtrack
The music was composed by Chandrabose and Lyrics were written by Vairamuthu. All songs were chartbusters during the time of release.

References

External links
 
 

1989 films
1980s Tamil-language films
Indian action films
Fictional portrayals of the Tamil Nadu Police
AVM Productions films
Indian multilingual films
1980s masala films
Films with screenplays by V. C. Guhanathan
1989 action films
1989 multilingual films
Films directed by L. Raja
Films scored by Chandrabose (composer)